Segmentina mica is a species of gastropods belonging to the family Planorbidae.

The species is in Japan, Southeastern Asia.

References

Planorbidae
Gastropods described in 1883